Yves Goussebaire-Dupin (19 July 1930 – 15 July 2021) was a French politician. A member of the Union for French Democracy, he served as Mayor of Dax from 1977 to 1995 and was in the Senate of France from 1983 to 1992.

References

1930 births
2021 deaths
French Senators of the Fifth Republic
Union for French Democracy politicians
Mayors of places in Nouvelle-Aquitaine
Senators of Landes
20th-century French politicians